Ian Riddell (1937/1938 – 25 September 2021) was a Scottish semi-professional footballer who played as a left-back.

Career
Riddell played for Jordanhill T.C., St Mirren and Berwick Rangers. He was a member of the Berwick team which famously beat Rangers in the Scottish Cup in 1967.

He played semi-professionally, combining his football career with a day job as a PE teacher.

He represented Scotland at under-23 level.

Personal life
Riddell died in September 2021, in a care home in Erskine.

His son is actor Derek Riddell.

References

1930s births
2021 deaths
Scottish footballers
Scotland under-23 international footballers
St Mirren F.C. players
Berwick Rangers F.C. players
Scottish Football League players
Association football fullbacks